General Pinto is a town in Buenos Aires Province, Argentina. It is the administrative centre for General Pinto Partido.

The settlement was officially founded on October 23, 1891 by provincial law number 2437. It is purely agricultural. The industrial production comes from her, with creameries, dairy and cheese factory among others.

Attractions

General Lavalle Museum & Fort
Martiniano Charras Municipal Park
Iglesia San José (church)
Domingo Faustino Sarmiento library

See also
Manuel Guillermo Pinto

External links

 Noroeste Bonaerense guide

Populated places in Buenos Aires Province
Populated places established in 1891
1891 establishments in Argentina